Metarbela abdulrahmani is a moth in the family Cossidae. It is found in Tanzania, where it has been recorded from the East Usambara Mountains. The habitat consists of submontane forests.

The length of the forewings is about 15 mm. The forewings are marguerite yellow with a light brownish-olive subterminal line, edged with deep colonial buff towards the termen. The hindwings are light brownish olive with darker veins.

Etymology
The species is named for Matano Abdulrahman of the Coastal Forest Conservation Unit.

References

Natural History Museum Lepidoptera generic names catalog

Endemic fauna of Tanzania
Metarbelinae
Moths described in 2008